Stefan Okunbor is an Irish footballer who has played both Gaelic football and Australian rules football.

Career
Okunbor began playing Gaelic football at the age of 7. He played for Kerry in the 2016 All-Ireland Minor Football Championship; he was later signed to Geelong Football Club for a two-year contract in 2018.

In 2021, his contract with Geelong ended; as a result, he returned to Ireland to play for Kerry.

Personal life
Stefan was born in Moldova to a Nigerian father and Moldovan mother; he moved to Tralee at the age of three. He is currently studying bioengineering at the University of Limerick.

References

Date of birth missing (living people)
Living people
Gaelic footballers who switched code
Irish players of Australian rules football
Kerry inter-county Gaelic footballers
Moldovan Gaelic footballers
Moldovan people of Nigerian descent
Irish people of Nigerian descent
Irish people of Moldovan descent
Year of birth missing (living people)